Old Catalan is the modern denomination for Romance varieties that during the Middle Ages were spoken in territories that spanned roughly the territories of the Principality of Catalonia, the Kingdom of Valencia, the Balearic Islands, and the island of Sardinia; all of them then part of the Crown of Aragon. These varieties were part of a dialect continuum with what today is called Old Occitan that reached  the Loire Valley in the north and Northern Italy in the east. Consequently, Old Catalan can be considered a dialect group of Old Occitan, or be classified as an Occitano-Romance variety side by side with Old Occitan (also known as Old Provençal).

The modern separation of Catalan and Occitan should not be confused with a clear separation between the languages in the mindset of their speakers historically. The dialects of Modern Catalan were still considered to be part of the same language as the dialects of Occitan in the 19th century, when Catalans still could call their language , using the name of the Limousin dialect as a metonymy for Occitan.

Phonology

Consonants

Laterals
The palatal lateral has remained unchanged in modern Catalan, but the  sequence has coalesced into  in most dialects (including all the Western bloc and most of Central Catalan) removing the distinction.

Around the 12th century, word-initial  became , but it continued to be spelled as  until the 15th century, when it was replaced by the modern  spelling.

Latin words with  would also come to be pronounced  just like in Spanish, but and unlike Spanish  could also appear word-finally.

Labiodentals
 began to merge into  in some dialects around the 14th century, a process called betacism. Now, the distinction is maintained only in Valencia, the Balearic Islands, and towns in southern Tarragona.

Affricates 
Likewise  was pronounced /dz/, and it would only later merge into /z/ (due to final-obstruent devoicing final  was also pronounced /ts/, as ). Instances of intervocalic /dz/ would be kept although with the rather different  spelling: compare Catalan/Occitan dotze 'twelve', tretze 'thirteen', setze 'sixteen' with Old French doze, treze, seze. Later instances of intervocalic /z/ from Greek and Arabic would also give the rise of a second /dz/, which would keep the  spelling.

Also due to final-obstruent devoicing, word-final instances of /dʒ/ would deaffricate to /tʃ/ (such as final -: puig 'hill', mig 'half'). Other instances of /tʃ/ (mostly borrowed non-native), came to be spelled with the rather different  spelling: fletxa 'arrow' (< Old French fleche, now flèche), botxí 'executioner' ( < Old French bouchier 'butcher'), caputxa 'hood' (< Italian cappuccio), butxaca 'pocket' ( < obscure) and remain with such spelling to this day.

Fricatives 
The affricate /dʒ/ originating from soft  and nonvocalic  would later deaffricate to /ʒ/.

The phoneme /ʃ/, which would initially only appear in intervocalic and word-final positions, would almost unanimously originate from instances of /ks/ (Latin ), */sts/ (Latin ), */ksts/ (Latin ), */ks/ from /ps/ (Latin ) and more rarely from palatalized /ss/. Due to the abundance of the first group of words, the spelling  would be adopted for /ʃ/, including in intervocalic instances (like in Portuguese but unlike Modern Catalan which spells such instances with ). Later /ʃ/ would also appear at word-initial position from palatalized /s/.

Non-geminated intervocalic /s/ was voiced and gave the original /z/ sound (later  would also merge with the latter sound).

Vowels

Balearic varieties (such as Majorcan, Minorcan in the western half of the island of Menorca and Ibizan in Sant Antoni de Portmany) still keep stressed .

It is assumed that during the preliterary period, all Catalan dialects featured a weak realization of the pretonic vowels.

Final post-tonic  were lost during the formation of Catalan. According to some historic studies, final nasals were velarised and assimilated before being lost in Modern Catalan: pan   →  →  (pa 'bread').

Orthography
Current Catalan orthography is mostly based on mediaeval practice, but some of the pronunciations and conventions have changed.
 The interpunct  was often used to indicate elision and hyphenation.
  represented , especially in the Valencian variant
In the modern language, it has come to be pronounced  or  depending on the dialect. Latin .
 Initial /, which appeared in the 12th century from initial , was written as  until the 15th century to maintain connections with Latin etyma. In the modern language, it is written as : e.g. modern  was written  ("book"). Cf. Latin .
  was frequently omitted: modern  was written  ("to have"), cf. Latin .
  was sometimes used to mark hiatus: modern  was written  ("neighbour")
 Final unvoiced obstruents were often written as such. In the modern language, the characters for their voiced counterparts may be used to reflect Latin etymology: modern  was written  ("cold"), cf. Latin .

History

Early Middle Ages 

By the 9th century, the Catalan language had developed from Vulgar Latin on both sides of the eastern end of the Pyrenees mountains (counties of Rosselló, Empúries, Besalú, Cerdanya, Urgell, Pallars and Ribagorça), as well as in the territories of the Roman province and later archdiocese of Tarraconensis to the south. From the 8th century on, the Catalan counts extended their territory southwards and westwards, conquering territories then occupied by Muslims, bringing their language with them.

This phenomenon gained momentum with the separation of the County of Barcelona from the Carolingian Empire in 988 AD. By the 9th century, the Christian rulers occupied the northern parts of present-day Catalonia, usually termed "Old Catalonia", and during the 11th and 12th centuries they expanded their domains to the region north of the Ebro river, a land known as "New Catalonia". During the 13th century, the Catalans expanded to the Land of Valencia and across to the Balearic Islands and Alghero in Sardinia.

According to historian Jaume Villanueva (1756–1824), the first attested Catalan sentence is thought to be found in an 8th-century manuscript from Ripoll that has since been lost. It was a whimsical note in 10th- or early 11th-century calligraphy: Magister m[eu]s no vol que em miras novel ("my master does not want you to watch me, newbie").

During the 11th century, several feudal documents (especially oaths and complaints) written in macaronic Latin began to exhibit elements of Catalan, with proper names or even sentences in Romance. Of special historical and linguistic importance is the Memorial of Complaints of Ponç I (ca. 1050–1060), featuring whole sentences in Romance. By the end of the 11th century, documents written completely or mostly in Catalan begin to appear, like the Complaints of Guitard Isarn, Lord of Caboet (ca. 1080–1095), or The Oath of peace and truce of count Pere Ramon (1098). Catalan shares many features with Gallo-Romance languages, which are mostly located in France and Northern Italy. Old Catalan diverged from Old Occitan between the 11th and 14th centuries.

Late Middle Ages
 
Catalan lived a golden age during the Late Middle Ages, reaching a peak of maturity and cultural plenitude. Examples of this can be seen in the works of Majorcan polymath Ramon Llull (1232–1315), the Four Great Chronicles (13th-14th centuries), and the Valencian school of poetry which culminated in Ausiàs March (1397–1459).

By the 15th century, the city of Valencia had become the center of social and cultural dynamism, and Catalan was present all over the Mediterranean world. The belief that political splendor was correlated with linguistic consolidation was voiced through the Royal Chancery, which promoted a highly standardized language.

The outstanding novel of chivalry Tirant lo Blanc (1490), by Joanot Martorell, shows the transition from medieval to Renaissance values, something than can also be seen in the works of Bernat Metge and Andreu Febrer. During this period, Catalan was what Costa Carreras terms "one of the 'great languages' of medieval Europe". The flowering of the Renaissance was closely associated with the advent of the printing press, and the first book produced with movable type in the Iberian Peninsula was printed in Valencia in 1474:  ("Poems of praise of the Virgin Mary").

See also
 History of Catalan
 Limousin language
 Old Provençal

References

Bibliography
 
 
 
 
 
 
 

Catalan language
Catalan